The Algemene Ouderdomswet ('General Old Age pensions Act, abbreviated AOW) is a 1956 Dutch law that installed a state pension for the elderly. This law was a continuation of a 1947 temporary law. The old law was a proposal by Willem Drees, while the new one came about when he was prime minister. It is the one thing he is remembered for most and his name is immortalised in the expression van Drees trekken (literally 'drawing from Drees' after the Dutch word steuntrekken for receiving social security).

The law provides for a base pension from an 'AOW age' which increases with time for everyone who had a permanent residency (with or without work) in the Netherlands during the 50 years before his age catches up with the AOW age (2016: 65 years and 6 months; 2017: 65 years and 9 months). For those who have not been a resident in the Netherlands for a full 50 years, the amount is proportional. If a pensioner has a common household with someone else (for example in the case of marriage or cohabitation), whether also a pensioner or not, the monthly amount is lower than if he or she lives alone.

References

Dutch legislation
Welfare in the Netherlands
1956 introductions
Age pension systems
Pensions in the Netherlands